Ivan Perić (born 5 May 1982 in Pristina, SFR Yugoslavia) is a Serbian footballer.

Club career 
Perić began his career in 2002 in the First League of Serbia and Montenegro with FK Obilić later with FK Zemun. In 2005, he played abroad in the Kazakhstan Premier League with FC Shakhter Karagandy. After a season in Asia he played in the Ukrainian Premier League with Arsenal Kiev. The following season he played in the K League 1 with Jeju United FC, and later returned to Shakhter Karagandy in 2008. During his second tenure with Shakhter he featured in the 2008–09 UEFA Cup against Debreceni VSC.

In 2010, he played with FC Zhetysu, and later with FC Aktobe. Throughout his time with Aktobe he played in the 2010–11 UEFA Champions League against Hapoel Tel Aviv, and Olimpi Rustavi. He also participated in the 2010–11 UEFA Europa League against AZ Alkmaar. In 2011, he played with FC Ordabasy, and in 2013 returned to Zhetysu. In 2014, he played in the TFF First League with Mersin İdman Yurdu.

On 18 June 2014, Perić moved to Albania where he signed with Kukësi on a one-year deal. Kukësi beat the concurrence of Albanian champions Skënderbeu Korçë who wanted to purchase the player after the departure of fellow Croatian striker Pero Pejić. He made his unofficial debut with the team against Macedonian side Metalurg Skopje, where he and Sokol Cikalleshi scored the goals of the 2–0 win. He played in the 2014–15 UEFA Europa League against FC Kairat. In 2015, he played in the Canadian Soccer League with Brampton United.

References

External links
 
 

1982 births
Living people
Serbian footballers
Mersin İdman Yurdu footballers
Serbian expatriate footballers
FK Zemun players
FC Arsenal Kyiv players
Jeju United FC players
FC Shakhter Karagandy players
FC Zhetysu players
FC Aktobe players
FC Ordabasy players
FC Taraz players
FK Kukësi players
Brampton United players
Kategoria Superiore players
Ukrainian Premier League players
TFF First League players
Kazakhstan Premier League players
K League 1 players
Canadian Soccer League (1998–present) players
Expatriate footballers in Ukraine
Expatriate footballers in Turkey
Expatriate footballers in South Korea
Expatriate footballers in Kazakhstan
Expatriate footballers in Albania
Serbian expatriate sportspeople in Turkey
Association football forwards